Goodenia purpurea is a species of flowering plant in the family Goodeniaceae and is endemic to the Northern Territory. It is an ascending herb with narrow oblong to lance-shaped leaves at the base of the plant, and racemes of purple flowers.

Description
Flowering mainly occurs from February to June and the fruit is a more or less spherical capsule  in diameter.

Taxonomy and naming
This species was first formally described in 1873 by Ferdinand von Mueller in his Fragmenta Phytographiae Australiae and was given the name Calogyne purpurea. In 1990, Roger Charles Carolin changed the name to Goodenia purpurea in the journal Telopea. The specific epithet (purpurea) means "purple".

Distribution and habitat
This goodenia grows in forest and woodland in the Arnhem Land region of the Northern Territory.

References

purpurea
Flora of the Northern Territory
Plants described in 1837
Taxa named by Ferdinand von Mueller